The 1994–95 Atlante F.C. season was the 4th season since the team's last promotion to Primera División. Atlante competed in Primera División and Copa México

Summary 
In summertime President Jose A. Garcia reinforced the squad with several players including the arrival of Forward Hugo Sanchez from Rayo Vallecano with a bigger salary than Real Madrid offered to him at his last contract (1991-92). In Copa Mexico the team was early eliminated on first round by Acapulco after a penalty series. In spite of a decent offensive line with Hugo Sanchez, Luis Miguel Salvador and playmaker Ruben Omar Romano (returned back to the club after playing in Veracruz one season), the defensive line was weak shattering its options for a classification to the Playoffs finishing the campaign 2 points below of Tiburones Rojos de Veracruz the last spot for the post-season.

According to Ricardo Lavolpe during the season Forward Hugo Sanchez compare the club to Rayo Vallecano in front of several team mates and the manager replied him:"You were relegated to Segunda Division in 1994, We won the League"

Squad

Transfers

Winter

Competitions

La Liga

League table

General table

Results by round

Matches

Copa Mexico

First round

CONCACAF Champions' Cup

Semifinals

Final

Statistics

Players statistics

References 

Atlante F.C. seasons
1994–95 Mexican Primera División season
1994–95 in Mexican football